Jagdeep Kaur Sahota (born in 1978) is a Canadian Punjabi politician who served as the Member of Parliament for the riding of Calgary Skyview from 2019 to 2021 as a member of the Conservative Party of Canada. She was elected to the House of Commons of Canada in the 2019 Canadian federal election.  She was defeated in the 2021 federal election, losing to George Chahal of the Liberal Party.

She previously ran in the 2015 Alberta general election for Calgary-McCall, losing to Irfan Sabir.

Electoral record

Federal

Provincial

References

External links
 

Living people
1978 births
Punjabi people
Conservative Party of Canada MPs
Members of the House of Commons of Canada from Alberta
Politicians from Calgary
Women members of the House of Commons of Canada
21st-century Canadian politicians
Lawyers in Alberta
Canadian women lawyers
Canadian Sikhs
Canadian politicians of Indian descent
21st-century Canadian women politicians